Kessleria albomaculata is a moth of the family Yponomeutidae. It is found in France.

The length of the forewings is 7.3-7.5 mm. The forewings are light to medium brown with some white scales. The hindwings are light greyish brown. Adults have been recorded in July.

References

Moths described in 1992
Yponomeutidae
Moths of Europe